John Raymond Christy is a climate scientist at the University of Alabama in Huntsville (UAH) whose chief interests are satellite remote sensing of global climate and global climate change. He is best known, jointly with Roy Spencer, for the first successful development of a satellite temperature record.

Early life and education
A native of Fresno, California, Christy became interested in the weather when he was a child. He became curious why the weather in the San Joaquin Valley was so different from that of the Sierra Mountains. He has recalled that "I built my first climate datasets when I was 12, using a mechanical pencil, graph paper, and long-division (no calculators back then.) I've been a climate nerd ever since." He received a BA in Mathematics from California State University, Fresno in 1973, and an MS and PhD in Atmospheric Sciences from the University of Illinois at Urbana–Champaign in 1984 and 1987. His doctoral thesis was titled, An investigation of the general circulation associated with extreme anomalies in hemispheric mean atmospheric mass.

Prior to his scientific career, Christy taught physics and chemistry as a missionary teacher in Nyeri, Kenya from 1973 to 1975. After earning a Master of Divinity degree from Golden Gate Baptist Seminary in 1978 he served four years as a bivocational mission-pastor in Vermillion, South Dakota, where he also taught college math.

Career
He is the Distinguished Professor of Atmospheric Science and Director of the Earth System Science Center at the University of Alabama in Huntsville (UAH). He was appointed Alabama's state climatologist in 2000. For his development of a global temperature data set from satellites, he was awarded NASA's Medal for Exceptional Scientific Achievement and the American Meteorological Society's "Special Award." In 2002, Christy was elected Fellow of the American Meteorological Society.

Satellite temperature record

Since 1989 Christy, along with Roy Spencer, has maintained an atmospheric temperature record derived from satellite microwave sounding unit measurements (see: satellite temperature record). This was once quite controversial: From the beginning of the satellite record in late 1978 into 1998 it showed a net global cooling trend, although ground measurements and instruments carried aloft by balloons showed warming in many areas. Part of the cooling trend seen by the satellites can be attributed to several years of cooler than normal temperatures and cooling caused by the eruption of the Mount Pinatubo volcano. Part of the discrepancy between the surface and atmospheric trends was resolved over a period of several years as Christy, Spencer and others identified several factors, including orbital drift and decay, that caused a net cooling bias in the data collected by the satellite instruments. Since the data correction of August 1998 (and the major La Niña Pacific Ocean warming event of the same year), data collected by satellite instruments have shown an average global warming trend in the atmosphere. From November 1978 through March 2011, Earth's atmosphere has warmed at an average rate of about 0.14 C per decade, according to the UAH satellite record.

Christy was a lead author of a section of the 2001 report by the IPCC and the U.S. CCSP report Temperature Trends in the Lower Atmosphere – Understanding and Reconciling Differences. Christy also signed the 2003 American Geophysical Union statement on climate change.

Christy has also performed detailed reconstruction of surface temperature for Central California. He found that recorded temperature changes there were consistent with an altered surface environment caused by increased irrigation for agriculture, which changed "a high-albedo desert into a darker, moister, vegetated plain."

Views
In a 2003 interview with National Public Radio about the 2003 American Geophysical Union (AGU) statement, he said he is "a strong critic of scientists who make catastrophic predictions of huge increases in global temperatures and tremendous rises in sea levels".  He added, though, that "it is scientifically inconceivable that after changing forests into cities, turning millions of acres into irrigated farmland, putting massive quantities of soot and dust into the air, and putting extra greenhouse gases into the air, that the natural course of climate has not changed in some way."

In a 2009 interview with Fortune Magazine about signing the 2003 American Geophysical Union (AGU) statement, he said: "As far as the AGU, I thought that was a fine statement because it did not put forth a magnitude of the warming. We just said that human effects have a warming influence, and that's certainly true. There was nothing about disaster or catastrophe. In fact, I was very upset about the latest AGU statement [in 2007]. It was about alarmist as you can get."

In a 2007 editorial in the Wall Street Journal, he wrote: "I'm sure the majority (but not all) of my IPCC colleagues cringe when I say this, but I see neither the developing catastrophe nor the smoking gun proving that human activity is to blame for most of the warming we see."

In a 2009 written testimony to the U.S. House Ways and Means Committee, he wrote: "From my analysis, the actions being considered to 'stop global warming' will have an imperceptible impact on whatever the climate will do, while making energy more expensive, and thus have a negative impact on the economy as a whole. We have found that climate models and popular surface temperature data sets overstate the changes in the real atmosphere and that actual changes are not alarming."

In 2014, Christy and his UAH colleague Richard McNider wrote an op-ed in The Wall Street Journal, arguing that climate models projected temperatures consistently higher than real-world satellite and balloon data. The authors also pointed to past instances where scientific consensus turned out to be incorrect.

Awards
 1991: NASA Exceptional Scientific Achievement Medal (with Roy Spencer).
 1996: AMS Special Award "for developing a global, precise record of Earth's temperature from operational polar-orbiting satellites, fundamentally advancing our ability to monitor climate" (with Roy Spencer).

See also
 Roy Spencer (scientist)
 UAH satellite temperature dataset

Selected publications

Articles

Peer-Reviewed Papers

References

External links

 Homepage
"Though Scorned by Colleagues, a Climate-Change Skeptic Is Unbowed", profile at New York Times, July 15, 2014
 "Global Warming – Where's The Alarm?", Presentation for the Society of American Foresters National Convention, 2010
 Written Statement of John R. Christy – Subcommittee on Energy and Power Committee on Energy and Commerce, U.S. House of Representatives, March 8, 2011
 "The Gospel According to John", Discover Magazine, February 1, 2001
 "What if global-warming fears are overblown?", Interview with Fortune magazine, May 14, 2009

Year of birth missing (living people)
Living people
American climatologists
Intergovernmental Panel on Climate Change contributing authors
Intergovernmental Panel on Climate Change lead authors
California State University, Fresno alumni
University of Illinois Urbana-Champaign alumni
University of Alabama in Huntsville faculty
People from Fresno, California
Fellows of the American Meteorological Society